Colin Espie PhD, DSc, FRSM, FBPsS FAASM (born 1957) is a Scottish Professor of Sleep Medicine in the Nuffield Department of Clinical Neuroscience at the University of Oxford and Fellow of Somerville College. He is closely involved with the development of the Sir Jules Thorn Sleep & Circadian Neuroscience Institute (SCNi) where he is Founding Director of the Experimental & Clinical Sleep Medicine Research programme, and Clinical Director of the Oxford Online Programme in Sleep Medicine. His particular areas of research expertise are in the assessment and treatment of sleep disorders, most particularly the management of insomnia using Cognitive Behavioral Therapy, and in studies on the aetiology and pathophysiology of insomnia.

Biography
Educated at the University of Glasgow with a PHD and DSc on sleep disorders, Espie was the founding Director of the University of Glasgow Sleep Centre from 1995 - 2012. He holds and has held adjunct or visiting professorial appointments at the Universities of Sydney, Rome (la Sapienza), Laval (Quebec City) and Rochester (NY).

Espie co-founded Big Health, the digital therapeutics company, with entrepreneur Peter Hames. The first programme, Sleepio is a fully automated digital CBT sleep improvement program, launched in 2010 with the intention "to disseminate evidence based CBT" and make "CBT for insomnia accessible to the wider population for the first time". The programme has been validated in a randomised placebo-controlled trial and has since been subject to a total of 12 pre-registered RCTs.  Sleepio received a UK NICE Guideline in May 2022

Espie has published over 300 scientific papers and has written and edited several books.

Other appointments
Espie is an Emeritus Professor in the College of Medical, Veterinary and Life Sciences at the University of Glasgow. He is Deputy Editor for the Journal of Sleep Research, the official journal of the ESRS, serves on the Editorial Board of Sleep Medicine Reviews and holds or has held many positions on national and international committees relating to sleep disorders and their treatment. He has been the recipient of numerous awards for his professional contributions including from the Sleep Research Society, the Society of Behavioral Sleep Medicine, and an Honorary Fellowship of the BABCP (British Association for Behavioural and Cognitive Psychotherapy).

Selected publications
Espie, C.A., Lindsay, W.R., Brooks, D.N., Hood, E.M. & Turvey, T. (1989) A controlled comparative investigation of psychological treatments for chronic sleep-onset insomnia. Behaviour Research and Therapy 27, 79-88

Espie, C.A., MacMahon, K.M.A., Kelly, H-L., Broomfield, N.M., Douglas, N.J., Engleman, H.E., McKinstry, B., Morin, C.M. Walker, A. & Wilson, P. (2007) Randomised clinical effectiveness trial of nurse-administered small group CBT for persistent insomnia in general practice. Sleep 30, 574-584

Espie, C.A., Fleming, L., Cassidy, J., Samuel, L., Taylor, L.M., White, C.A., Douglas, N.J., Engleman, H.E., Kelly, H-L. & Paul, J. (2008) Randomized controlled clinical effectiveness trial of Cognitive Behavior Therapy versus Treatment as Usual for persistent insomnia in cancer patients. Journal of Clinical Oncology 26, 4651-4658

Espie, C.A., Kyle, S.D, Williams, C., Ong, J.C., Douglas, N.J., Hames, P., & Brown, J.S.L. (2012) A randomized, placebo-controlled, trial of online Cognitive Behavioral Therapy for chronic Insomnia Disorder delivered via an automated media-rich web application.  SLEEP 35, 769-781

Espie, C.A., Emsley, R., Kyle, S.D., Gordon, C., Drake, C.L., Siriwardena, A.N., Cape, J., Ong, J.C., Sheaves, B., Foster, R., et al. (2019). Effect of Digital Cognitive Behavioral Therapy for Insomnia on Health, Psychological Well-being, and Sleep-Related Quality of Life: A Randomized Clinical Trial. JAMA Psychiatry 76, 21-30.

Miller, A. Espie, C.A. & Scott, J. (2004) The sleep of remitted bipolar outpatients: a controlled naturalistic study using actigraphy. Journal of Affective Disorders 80, 145-153

Stott, R,, Pimm, J,, Emsley, R., Miller, C.B., & Espie, C.A. (2021) Does adjunctive digital CBT for insomnia improve clinical outcomes in an improving access to psychological therapies service? Behavior Research & Therapy 144, 103922

Freeman, D., Sheaves, B., Goodwin, G.M., Yu, L.M., Nickless, A., Harrison, P.J., Emsley, R., Luik, A.I., Foster, R.G., Wadekar, V., Hinds, C., Gumley, A., Jones, R., Lightman, S., Jones, S., Bentall, R., Kinderman, P., Rowse, G., Brugha, T., Blagrove, M., Gregory, A.M., Fleming, L., Walklet, E., Glazebrook, C., Davies, E.B., Hollis, C., Haddock, G., John, B., Coulson, M., Fowler, D., Pugh, K., Cape, J., Moseley, P., Brown, G., Hughes, C., Obonsawin, M., Coker, S., Watkins, E., Schwannauer, M., MacMahon, K., Siriwardena, A.N. & Espie, C.A. (2017). The effects of improving sleep on mental health (OASIS): a randomised controlled trial with mediation analysis. The Lancet Psychiatry 4, 749-758.

Maurer, L.F., Espie, C.A., Omlin, X., Reid, M.J., Sharman, R., Gavriloff, D., Emsley, R & Kyle S.D. (2020). Isolating the role of time in bed restriction in the treatment of insomnia: A randomized, controlled, dismantling trial comparing sleep restriction therapy with time in bed regularization. SLEEP 43(11) zsaa096

Espie, C.A., Kyle, S.D., Hames, P., Gardani, M., Fleming, L., &Cape, J. (2014). The Sleep Condition Indicator: a clinical screening tool to evaluate Insomnia Disorder. BMJ Open 4:e004183.

BOOKS

Espie, C.A. (2021) Overcoming Insomnia: A Self-Help Guide Using Cognitive Behavioural Techniques, 2nd edition. Little, Brown Book Group, London [ISBN:978-1-47214-141-5]

Baglioni, C., Espie, C.A., & Riemann D. (2022) Cognitive Behavioural Therapy for Insomnia across the Lifespan: Guidelines and Clinical Protocols for Health Professionals. Wiley & Sons, London, and New York [9781119785132]

Espie, C.A. (due 2023) The Clinician’s Guide to Cognitive and Behavioural Therapeutics (CBTx) for Insomnia: a Scientist-Practitioner Approach. Cambridge University Press, UK

Espie, C.A., Zee, P., & Morin, C.M. (due 2023) The Oxford Handbook of Sleep and Sleep Disorders (Oxford Library of Psychology) 2nd edition. Oxford University Press, USA

See also
 Cognitive behavioral therapy for insomnia
 Sleep medicine

References

1957 births
Living people
Scottish neuroscientists
Alumni of the University of Glasgow
Academics of the University of Oxford
Fellows of Somerville College, Oxford